Holy Holy is a supergroup which performs the musical works of David Bowie. The group features drummer Woody Woodmansey, formerly of Bowie's backing band The Spiders from Mars and Tony Visconti, Bowie's long time producer and occasional bass player, as well as a number of other notable musicians. Since the beginning of 2022, Steve "Smiley" Barnard replaced Woody Woodmansey as drummer.

Members
Bass: Tony Visconti
Drums: Woody Woodmansey
Drums: Steve "Smiley" Barnard
Vocals: Glenn Gregory
Guitar: James Stevenson
Guitar: Paul Cuddeford
Keyboards: Berenice Scott
Keyboards: Janette Mason (2022)
Vocals, saxophone, guitar : Jessica Lee Morgan

Occasional and former contributors
Vocals: Marc Almond
Saxophone and guitar: Terry Edwards
Guitar/vocals: Gary Kemp
Saxophone: Steve Norman
Bass: Erdal Kızılçay
Bass/vocals: Glen Matlock
Drums: Clem Burke
Piano: Rod Melvin
Bass/Rhythm Guitar: David Donley
Vocals: Hannah Berridge
Vocals: Maggie Ronson
Vocals: Lisa Ronson
Vocals: Elizabeth Westwood
Vocals: Tracie Hunter

Tours
The group undertook a short tour in the UK in September 2014 and a larger scale tour of the UK and Japan in the summer of 2015. In January 2016 they toured the east coast of the United States and followed this with a full tour of US and Canadian cities in the Spring of the same year. Their show consisted of a first half during which they performed David Bowie's classic The Man Who Sold the World and a second half during which early Bowie classics were performed. In March–April 2017 they performed another Bowie album in its entirety, The Rise and Fall of Ziggy Stardust and the Spiders from Mars in Hull and other UK cities. They continue to tour.

Releases
In September 2014, the band released a double A side single comprising the new song "We Are King", written and sung by Steve Norman of Spandau Ballet with a cover of David Bowie's "Holy Holy" sung by Heaven 17’s Glenn Gregory. In June 2015 they released a live recording of their The Man Who Sold the World show, recorded live in London and produced by Tony Visconti.

References 

David Bowie
British supergroups
Rock music supergroups